The Los Angeles Angels were a professional baseball team that played in the California League in 1892, 1893, 1901 and 1902. Their first home park was Athletic Park.

References

Defunct California League teams
Defunct baseball teams in California
1892 establishments in California
1902 disestablishments in California
Baseball teams established in 1892
Baseball teams disestablished in 1902